ZOO Digital Group PLC is a provider of cloud software based subtitling, dubbing, and media localization services to the TV and movie industry. Its production facilities are located in El Segundo, Los Angeles; London and Sheffield, UK and Dubai, U.A.E. The company employs more than 500 employees worldwide and utilizes a global network of over 5,000 freelance translators and dubbing artists.

History

2001–2003: Founding and incorporation
In 2001, Gremlin Interactive founder Ian Stewart led a merger of Kazoo3D PLC and ZOO Media Corporation Ltd to form ZOO Digital Group PLC. In 2003, two co-divisions were formed. ZOOtech Ltd was established to develop software for interactive DVDs. ZOO Digital Publishing, an operating division of the group, was established to create video games.

2003–2005: Success with interactive video games and software for DVD
In 2003, ZOO Digital Publishing published the interactive DVD for the game show, Who Wants to Be a Millionaire. In the same year, ZOO Digital Publishing won the award for Navigation Design and Implementation Excellence at the DVD Association Excellence Awards, New York.

In 2004, ZOOtech launched DVD EXTRA Studio enabling new levels of interactivity on DVDs. ZOOtech also opened an office in Paris in order to give the business a base for expanding DVD EXTRA applications for European markets. In the same year, ZOO Digital Publishing released Who Wants to Be a Millionaire? 2nd Edition for Game Boy Advance. In 2004, for a second year, the company won the Navigation Design and Implementation Excellence, DVD Association Excellence Awards, New York. ZOOtech was also crowned the overall winner at the Sheffield Business Awards and picked up the Sheffield Business Award for Innovation.

In the same year ZOO Digital Publishing bought Hothouse Creations, a computer games developer based in Bristol which had developed computer and video games including Who Wants to Be a Millionaire? on PlayStation 1 and Pop Idol and American Idol on PlayStation 2.

In 2005, 60% of the interactive DVDs on the market were being made using ZOOtech's DVD Extra Studio. In the same year, ZOO Digital Publishing won three awards at the DVD Association Excellence Awards ceremony in New York City: Guinness World Records 2005 won the DVD Video Game Excellence Award, Who Wants to Be a Millionaire? 2nd Edition won the Navigation Design and Implementation Excellence Award and Manchester United, The Official Interactive-DVD won the Technical Achievement Excellence Award.

2006–2012: Refocus on technology for media and entertainment
In 2006, Dr Stuart Green took over as Chief Executive Officer of ZOO Digital Group and Ian Stewart stepped down. ZOO Digital Group sold two of its subsidiaries. ZOO Digital Publishing, the division creating video games was sold following a decline in the traditional DVD market. ZOO Interactive Video, also formerly part of ZOO Digital Publishing, was sold. The company adopted the operating name ZOO Digital. In the same year, ZOOtech won the Annual DVDA Excellence Award at Digital Hollywood for DVD EXTRA Studio.

In 2007, ZOO Digital acquired Los Angeles-based Scope Seven, a media production and design company providing compression and authoring services to video publishers including a number of Hollywood studios. ZOOtech announced a deal with Mattel Inc. (MAT) to develop DVD games, including the High School Musical 2 DVD Board Game and 1 vs. 100 DVD Game.

In 2008, ZOO Digital announced a 15-year contract with Walt Disney Studio Motion Pictures International to deliver its software automation products to DVD film releases. Sony Pictures Entertainment also licensed ZOO's Templated Authoring System ("TAS") in order to produce standard definition DVD titles.

In 2010, ZOO Digital's new iTunes toolset was adopted by a major Hollywood studio. The iTunes toolkit was designed to automate the production of menus and bonus features. In the same year, Multi Packaging Solutions (MPS) partnered with ZOO Digital to use its software for managing brand identity and marketing for multinational brands. ZOO Digital's  software was designed to integrate "language translation, localization, proofing, global collaboration, version control, and archiving."

In 2011, the decline in the DVD market saw ZOO Digital report a half-year loss.

2012–Present: Cloud localization services 
In 2012, ZOO Digital launched cloud subtitling services for TV and movie content with ZOOsubs. 2014 saw ZOO announced by Apple as one of four vendors selected to provide new iTunes packaging services to its Compressor users. 2015 saw ZOO sign a deal with BBC Worldwide to provide it with a new subtitling and captioning platform. In 2016, ZOO became a Netflix Preferred Vendor; this changed to a Netflix Preferred Fulfilment Partner in 2018.

In 2017, ZOO launched the entertainment industry's first cloud dubbing service, powered by its proprietary ZOOdubs software platform and won a NewBay Media Best of Show Award at the NAB Show 2017 and an award at IBC Show 2017 at the IABM Design & Innovation Awards in the Post Production category.

In 2018, ZOO Digital's ZOOdubs cloud dubbing service won an IABM award in the ‘Publish’ category and ZOO won the Best Performing Share Award at the AIM Awards 2018 and Company of the Year at the Small Cap UK Awards.

In March 2021, Zoo Digital has announced plans to boost its progress after a £7.4 million IPO on the London Stock Exchange. It plans to collect funds from a placement by issuing 7.0 million shares at a price of 100 pence each, for a total of GBP7.0 million.

In 2022, the company reported growth of 78% from the previous year.

Software 

 DVD Extra 
 DVD Extra Studio 
 eBook Builder 
 Template Authoring System (TAS) 
 Media Adaptation Tool (MAT) 
 ZOOcore
 ZOOsubs
 ZOOdubs

Services (current) 

 Subtitling
 Dubbing
 Closed Captioning
 Digital Distribution

Development grants 

 Collaboration Systems for Digital Media Production 8 Feb – 10 Oct, £711,570, Innovate UK award
 Commercialisation of Motion Pictures Archives (COMPA) 10 Jan – 12 Dec, £765,366, Innovate UK award
 Persistent And Robust Tracking of Entertainment Content (PARTEC) 11 Jun – 13 May, £338,754, Innovate UK award
 Optimising Production Through Implicit Metadata In Scripts for Television (OPTIMIST) 11 Nov – 13 Apr, £267,813, Innovate UK award
 Process Automation for Localisation of Dialogue in Entertainment Media (PALODIEM) 14 Oct – 16 Sep, £250,000, Innovate UK award
 Multimedia Analysis for Unsupervised Dubbing In Entertainment (MAUDIE) 18 May – 21 Apr, £823,460, Innovate UK award

References 

Software companies of England
Companies based in Sheffield
British companies established in 2001
Software companies established in 2001
2001 establishments in England
Companies listed on the Alternative Investment Market